Günther's grenadier (Coryphaenoides guentheri) is a species of deep-sea fish in the family Macrouridae.

The fish is named in honor of ichthyologist-herpetologist Albert Günther (1830-1914) of the British Museum (Natural History).

Description
The head is compressed, with large eyes; the body is generally brownish, with the mouth and gill cavity darker.

Habitat

Behaviour
Günther's grenadier feeds on small benthic invertebrates.

References

Macrouridae
Fish described in 1888
Taxa named by Léon Vaillant